Unger Island is a small, ice-free island of Antarctica. It lies 4 miles to the southeast of the Cape Hooker, and is the westernmost of the Lyall Islands — at Latitude 70° 41' 00.0" S, Longitude 166° 55' 00.0" E.

It was originally mapped in the 1960s from surveys and U.S. Navy photographs by the United States Geological Survey (USGS).  It was named for Lt. Pat B. Unger, USNR, the Medical Officer at Little America V in 1957. It is the only ice free island in Antarctica.

References

Islands of Victoria Land
Pennell Coast